"It Is Well" is a song performed by Bethel Music and Kristene DiMarco. It was released to Christian radio in the United States as the second single from Bethel Music's ninth album, You Make Me Brave (2014), on March 27, 2015.  Kristene DiMarco wrote the song, with Horatio Spafford and Philip Bliss receiving posthumous credits for the interpolation of the hymn "It Is Well with My Soul". Gabriel Wilson and Daniel Mackenzie handled the production of the single.

"It Is Well" peaked at number 27 on the Hot Christian Songs chart in the United States. The song has been certified platinum by the Recording Industry Association of America (RIAA).

Background
On February 25, 2015, Bethel Music announced that "It It Well" will be released to Christian radio stations in the United States on March 27, 2015. The song was released in digital format on March 31, 2015.

Kristene DiMarco shared the story behind the song in an interview with Kevin Davis of NewReleaseToday, saying:

Composition

Commercial performance
"It Is Well" debuted at number 46 on the US Hot Christian Songs chart dated May 10, 2014. The song went on to peak at number 27 and spent a total of twenty-two non-consecutive weeks on the chart.

Music videos
Bethel Music released the live music video of "It Is Well" through their YouTube channel on April 28, 2014 with Kristene DiMarco leading the song. On April 18, 2015, the lyric video of the song was published by Bethel Music on their YouTube channel.

Charts

Certifications

Release history

Other versions
 Passion released their version of "It Is Well" featuring Kristian Stanfill on their live album, Even So Come (2015).
 Kristene DiMarco released her own rendition of "It Is Well" on her live album, Mighty (2015).
 Bethel Music released an instrumental remix of the song on their instrumental album, Without Words: Synesthesia (2015).

References

External links
  on PraiseCharts

2015 singles
2014 songs
Bethel Music songs